"Party Mode" is a song written by Jerry Flowers, Ryan Beaver, Roman Alexander, Jared Keim, and Matt McGinn and recorded by American country music artist Dustin Lynch. It was released on February 14, 2022, as the second single from Lynch's fifth studio album Blue in the Sky.

Content 
The song describes a man who goes into town for the "night life" after experiencing heartbreak from a breakup. Lynch also described the song as an account of an experience he had with his previous relationship.

Critical reception 
Jeffrey Kurtis of Today's Country Magazine wrote that the song "turns the corner from being just a bright, up-tempo placement on radio playlists, to being a song that can potentially reach through the speakers to help people admit the things they are dealing with during their own breakup misery and how they're choosing to cope with them, bringing to light a potentially better way to face it."

Music video 
An accompanying music video was released on February 11, 2022, featuring Lynch and friends as a suitcase mix-up involving cash during travel results in the four doing various activities such as mini golf, until they are confronted by a gang who the cash originally belonged to. After being rescued, the four head home.

Charts

Weekly charts

Year-end charts

Release history

References 

2022 songs
2022 singles
Dustin Lynch songs
BBR Music Group singles
Songs written by Jerry Flowers
Songs written by Matt McGinn (songwriter)